Wei Qingguang, later Seiko Iseki (born July 2, 1962) is a Chinese table tennis player.

Table tennis player
He won the 1988 Seoul Olympic Games in the doubles with Chen Longcan. Later he represented Japan and changed his name to Seiko Iseki.

He won a gold medal in the doubles with Chen Longcan at the 1987 World Table Tennis Championships

Achievements
1984 National Championships - 1st singles, mixed doubles & team
1985 National Championships - 1st doubles & mixed doubles
1986 Asian Cup - 1st singles
1987 World Championships - 1st doubles (with Chen Longcan)
1988 Olympic Games - 1st doubles (with Chen Longcan)
1989 World Championships - 3rd doubles

See also
 List of table tennis players
 List of World Table Tennis Championships medalists

References 

  - China Daily

1962 births
Living people
Chinese male table tennis players
Japanese male table tennis players
Table tennis players at the 1988 Summer Olympics
Table tennis players at the 2000 Summer Olympics
Olympic table tennis players of China
Olympic gold medalists for China
Olympic medalists in table tennis
Olympic table tennis players of Japan
Table tennis players from Guangxi
People from Nanning
Medalists at the 1988 Summer Olympics
Naturalised table tennis players
Chinese emigrants to Japan
Naturalized citizens of Japan
Asian Games medalists in table tennis
Table tennis players at the 1990 Asian Games
Table tennis players at the 1998 Asian Games
Asian Games gold medalists for China
Asian Games silver medalists for China
Asian Games bronze medalists for China
Medalists at the 1990 Asian Games
Japanese sportspeople of Chinese descent